Abdelkader Harizi (born July 14, 1987, in Djendel) is an Algerian football player. He currently plays for MC El Eulma in the Algerian Ligue Professionnelle 1.

Club career
On January 7, 2010, it was announced that Harizi had signed a six-month contract with USM Blida, after spending five seasons with CR Belouizdad. On April 14, 2010, he scored his first league goal for USM Blida in a 2-1 loss to ES Sétif.

References

External links
 DZFoot Profile
 

1987 births
Living people
People from Aïn Defla Province
Algerian footballers
Algerian Ligue Professionnelle 1 players
CR Belouizdad players
MC Oran players
USM Blida players
USMM Hadjout players
Association football midfielders
21st-century Algerian people